Trichodiadema mirabile is succulent plant of the genus Trichodiadema, native to the Western Cape Province, South Africa, where it is known from the Laingsburg area and especially from south-facing slopes.

Description
A small, erect shrub, reaching up to 11 cm. 

The leaves are erect, stiff and papillate, and each leaf is tipped with dark-brown, erect-inclining bristles. 

The flowers are white to pale-cream in colour, with white filamentous staminodes at the centre, and are on short stalks.

The fruit capsule has six locules, each locule with distinctive V-shaped covering membranes.

Related species
It very closely resembles Trichodiadema orientale, a species from the Eastern Cape, which however has 5 locules, longer papillae on its bladder cells, and has flowers that are more pinkish-white (sometimes white with pinkish petal tips).

Trichodiadema mirabile, T. orientale and T. hallii are the only three species in the genus to have erect-inclining diadem bristles.

References

mirabile
Taxa named by N. E. Brown
Taxa named by Martin Heinrich Gustav Schwantes